Love Is Dead may refer to:

 Love Is Dead (Chvrches album), 2018
 Love Is Dead (Kerli album), 2008
 Love Is Dead (The Mr. T Experience album), 1996
 "Love Is Dead" (song), a 2007 song by Brett Anderson
 "Love Is Dead" Tokio Hotel song from the Scream album
 "Love Is Dead", a 2010 song by D'espairsRay from Monsters